Svenska Utlandstidningen ("Swedish Foreign Newspaper") was a weekly newspaper for non-resident Swedes published between January 1908 and April 1913.

History and profile
Svenska Utlandstidningen was initially published from Berlin by Schwedische Zeitungs-Ges.m.b.H., and carried the byline 'Organ for the Swedes Abroad'. Politically the publication declared itself independent from all political party interests. From January 1909 to April 1913 it was published by Svenska Dagbladet from Stockholm.

References

1908 establishments in Germany
1913 disestablishments in Germany
Defunct newspapers published in Germany
Defunct newspapers published in Sweden
Defunct weekly newspapers
Newspapers published in Berlin
Weekly newspapers published in Sweden
Newspapers established in 1908
Publications disestablished in 1913
Swedish-language newspapers
Weekly newspapers published in Germany
Newspapers published in Stockholm